Padosan is an Indian comedy drama series created and co-produced by Ekta Kapoor under their banner Balaji Telefilms. The series premiered in 1995 on DD Metro.

Plot
The series revolves around Ajay Tripathi who talks with the furniture in his house which in turn, gives him insights on life.
The series presents the stories from day to day life in a humorous way.

Cast 
 Jatin Kanakia as Ajay Tripathi
 Smita Talwalkar
 Shrikant Moghe
 Satish Pulekar
 Kishore Ambey
 Vandana Pathak
 Priya Arun
 Dharmesh Vyas
 Rakhi Vijan
 Seema Kapoor

References

External links 
 Official Website

Balaji Telefilms television series
DD National original programming
Indian television soap operas
1995 Indian television series debuts